Chile 672, also known as 672 Chile Street, is a 2006 Argentine film directed by Pablo Bardauil and Franco Verdoia, and written by Bardauil. The movie was partly funded by INCAA. The film is Pablo Bardauil and Franco Verdoia's first feature film.

Plot
The setting of the story is San Telmo, one of the oldest barrios of Buenos Aires.

The film tells of the characters who live in a building on 672 Chile Street, they include:
 An afflicted driver Nelson Infanti (José Luis Alfonzo) who finds calmness in Macarena (Hossana Ricón) a young girl he takes to school each morning;
 An actress Malena Marlene (Maria Lorenzutti) who used to be famous and seeks to have a strong comeback in her profession;
 A devout and orphan young girl Silvia Locatti (Erica Rivas) who listens to moans that come from the next apartment;
 A liberal Italian Simona Innocenti (Patricia Camponovo) who has won the enmity of her neighbors who are collecting signatures so that she can be evicted from the building.

Cast
 José Luis Alfonzo as Nelson Infanti
 Hossana Ricón as Macarena
 Maria Lorenzutti as Malena Marlene
 Lito Cruz as Carlos Márquez
 Érica Rivas as Silvia Locatti
 Patricia Camponovo as Simona Innocenti
 Oscar Alegre as Emir
 Gonzalo Arguimbau as Jorge
 Alejandro Bardauil as Vecino Asamblea
 Pablo Bardauil as Santiago
 Dora Baret as Madre Silvia
 Alejandra Bernasconi as Vecina Asamblea
 Héctor Bidonde as Padre Silva
 Carlos Bohm as Utilero
 Paulo Brunetti as Osmar
 Susana Bueno as Vedette
 Federico Busso as Assistante
 Vera Fogwill as Enfermera

Background
The film took five years to finish.  One of the problems directors Bardauil and Verdoia had was that they started filming before their financing package was complete.

The Argentine economy crashed right after they began to shoot in the early 2000s.  Co-director Bardauil said, "Chile 672 was conceived before the country’s economic downfall. So, originally it wasn't our decision to refer to the crisis, rather it was its explosion which forced us to reformulate the story later on."

Distribution
The picture was first presented at the Rome Film Festival, Italy on October 14, 2006.

The film opened in Argentina on November 30, 2006.

It has been screened at a few film festivals, including: the Latin American Film Festival, London; the International Film Festival, Goa, India; the International Film Festival Mannheim-Heidelberg, Germany; and others.

Awards
Wins
 Trieste Festival of Latin-American Cinema: Jury Prize, Best Screenplay, Pablo Bardauil; 2006.
 Cine Ceará – National Cinema Festival: Feature Film Trophy, Best Screenplay, Pablo Bardauil; 2007

References

External links
 
 
 Chile 672 at the cinenacional.com 
 Chile 672  film trailer at YouTube

2006 films
2006 drama films
Argentine independent films
2000s Spanish-language films
Films shot in Buenos Aires
2006 directorial debut films
2006 independent films
Argentine drama films
2000s Argentine films